The IAU 50 km World Championships is an annual, global ultrarunning competition over 50 kilometres organized by the International Association of Ultrarunners (IAU).

The competition began life as the IAU 50 km World Trophy in 2005. It served as the final leg of the IAU 50 km Challenge circuit, with runners gaining qualification through performances on one of the nine preceding qualifying races. The winners of the men's and women's trophy were decided by the best aggregate time of their World Trophy race plus their best time from the qualifying round. The race moved away from aggregate scoring, with the World Trophy race becoming a straight final, and it continued in this format up to 2014. The 2008 and 2013 editions were cancelled due to the number of world championships the IAU was already organised that year.

The inaugural World Championship event took place in Doha, Qatar in December 2015. This included men's and women's races with individual and team elements. The team titles were decided by the three best combined times set by a nation's runners at the competition. For 2014 to 2017 it was agreed that the competition would be hosted in Doha for those years, moving the competition away from its tradition of changing host each year. The competition signalled commitment to the sport in Qatar, with Doha hosting its first ultramarathon in the months preceding the 2014 championship.

It is one of four world championships organised by the IAU, with the others being the IAU 100 km World Championships, IAU 24 Hour World Championship and the IAU Trail Running World Championships.

The inaugural edition in 2005 incorporated a European Championship race. Oleg Kharitonov was the men's winner, with World Trophy winner Sandor Barcza  as runner-up and Stefano Sartori in third. The European Championship and World Trophy places matched on the women's side, with Heather Foundling-Hawker winner of both. The European Championship was abandoned after the launch of the World Championships. It had only been held twice (Mario Ardemagni and Danielle Sanderson were the 2004 winners).

Editions

Medal summary

Men

Women

Men's team

Women's team

See also
Ultramarathon
International Association of Ultrarunners
IAU 100 km World Championships

References

External links
IAU official site

50 km
Recurring sporting events established in 2005
Ultramarathons